Argistes is a genus of araneomorph spiders in the family Liocranidae, containing three species restricted to Sri Lanka and Namibia.

Species
 Argistes africanus Simon, 1910 — Namibia
 Argistes seriatus (Karsch, 1892) — Sri Lanka
 Argistes velox Simon, 1897 — Sri Lanka

References

Liocranidae
Spiders of Africa
Spiders of Asia
Araneomorphae genera